Afrah or Afraah (Arabic: أَفْرَاح, afrāḥ) is an Arabic female given name meaning "joyful, happiness, gladness, delight, pleasure, merriment, exhilaration", "high spirits, joy (delight) of the chest" and is also the literal word for "wedding".

The name is the plural or the superlative form of the name Farah.

People with this name include:
Afrah Gomdi, Tunisian Paralympic athlete
Afrah Nasser, Yemeni journalist
Abdullahi Afrah (died 2008), Somali leader in the Union of Islamic Courts
Abdulahi Ahmed Afrah, Somali politician
Mohamed Afrah Hassan (1974–2019), Maldivian film actor and producer known as Mohamed Afrah
Mohamed Afrah Qanyare (born c. 1941), Somali warlord
Hussein Kulmiye Afrah (1920–1993), Vice president of Somalia 1969–1991
Muktar Hussein Afrah, Somali army officer

Given names